This is a list of episodes for Late Night with Conan O'Brien, which aired from September 13, 1993 to February 20, 2009.


Series overview

Episodes

Season 1

Season 2

Season 3

Season 4

Season 5

Season 6

Season 7

Season 8

Season 9

Season 10

Season 11

Season 12

Season 13

Season 14

Season 15

Season 16

References 
 

Episodes